Uwe Sterzik (born 27 April 1966) is a German water polo player. He competed at the 1988 Summer Olympics, the 1992 Summer Olympics and the 1996 Summer Olympics. During his career, he won more than 340 international caps and later became the coach of the Swiss national team.

References

External links
 

1966 births
Living people
German male water polo players
Olympic water polo players of West Germany
Olympic water polo players of Germany
Water polo players at the 1988 Summer Olympics
Water polo players at the 1992 Summer Olympics
Water polo players at the 1996 Summer Olympics
People from Ostrov (Karlovy Vary District)